The 2001 PBA Commissioner's Cup Finals was the best-of-7 championship series of the 2001 PBA Commissioner's Cup and the conclusion of the conference's playoffs. The San Miguel Beermen and sophomore team Batang Red Bull Thunder played for the 79th championship contested by the league.

Batang Red Bull Thunder won the Commissioner's Cup title in only their second season and fifth conference. The Thunder defeated San Miguel Beermen, winners of five of the last six conferences, in Game Six for a 4-2 series victory.

Danny Ildefonso won on his Second Back To Back Season MVP in Commissioner's Cup.

Davonn Harp won on his First Finals MVP in Commissioner's Cup Finals.

Series scoring summary

Games summary

Game 1

The Thunder climbed from five points down, 73-78, after allowing the Beermen to dominate most of the second half. Antonio Lang and Davonn Harp hit three of their seven free throws in the final minute. San Miguel was nursing a 78-77 lead with 48 seconds left, after Danny Seigle missed a jumper in the ensuing play, Lang hit an undergoal stab from a Junthy Valenzuela pass and drew Nate Johnson's sixth foul with 5.1 seconds left. Red Bull was holding a 79-78 lead when Lang missed his bonus shot but Harp got the rebound, causing Olsen Racela to foul him with 3.5 seconds remaining, Harp made only his first. After a San Miguel timeout, Danny Seigle missed on a drive as time expired.

Game 2

Junthy Valenzuela hit seven triples, five of them in the second half, to frustrate San Miguel. Antonio Lang also shone on Red Bull's free-wheeling offense, making 20 points and includes a highlight double-pump that drew a foul from Danny Ildefonso with 1:31 left that gave the Thunder an 85-76 lead. Lang's superb game got the ire of Nic Belasco, who hackled him underneath while taking a shot, causing a near free-for-all with eight minutes left in the game and Red Bull ahead, 74-66.

Game 3

San Miguel's Danny Ildefonso, Danny Seigle and Olsen Racela hit their free throws in the closing minutes to deflect Junthy Valenzuela's torrid three-point shooting in the third and fourth quarters. Valenzuela's last triple put Red Bull to within 86-88 with 2:08 left, which turned out to be the Thunder's last stand as the Beermen tightened their defenses going into the homestretch.

Game 4

San Miguel rode to a 12-0 run in the fourth quarter, Boybits Victoria sparked the run with a three-pointer with eight minutes left in the game, giving the Beermen a 65-62 lead despite the foul trouble of Nate Johnson, who got his fifth with 7:51 left. The Thunder lost Junthy Valenzuela early in the first quarter as he was thrown out for elbowing Johnson.

Game 5

Red Bull threw a huge defensive blanket on San Miguel in the dying seconds to escape with a pulsating two-point victory. Willie Miller blocked Nate Johnson's point-blank attempt in the last 1.8 seconds, after getting the inbound pass from Dwight Lago in the shaded area. Johnson, who scored the largest output in the series with 43 points, was ganged up by Miller, Antonio Lang and Davonn Harp, confusion erupted after the final buzzer as players from both sides trash-talked their way to the dugout.

Game 6

San Miguel fell behind by 17 points in the second quarter, 18-35, but Danny Seigle orchestrated a comeback to keep the Beermen within striking distance. The Thunder outsteadied the Beermen in the endgame, from a 70-69 lead, Red Bull drew two points apiece from Davonn Harp and Ato Agustin before Antonio Lang's free throw iced Red Bull's title-clinching win. Junthy Valenzuela also stars when he blocked Danny Seigle's three-pointer in the closing seconds and then saved a sideline loose ball to preserve the victory. Davonn Harp won on his first sophomore Finals MVP and Batang Red Bull captures of this first championship crown title.

Occurrences
Red Bull's Junthy Valenzuela was fined P40,000 but escaped suspension following a flagrant foul on San Miguel import Nate Johnson in Game 4 of the finals wherein he was thrown out of the ballgame as early in the first quarter, previous to that, Valenzuela's teammate Kerby Raymundo was suspended for one game in the series.

Rosters

Broadcast notes

References

External links
PBA official website

2001 PBA season
2001
San Miguel Beermen games
Barako Bull Energy Boosters games
PBA Commissioner's Cup Finals